Paul Stanton (born Paul George Stahl; December 21, 1884 – October 9, 1955) was an American character actor and bit-part player in American films.

Originally from Illinois, he appeared in about 130 films between 1918 and 1952, mostly in supporting roles. He often portrayed authoritarian figures like judges, attorneys, managers, officials and doctors.

Selected filmography

 The Girl and the Judge (1918) - Walter Stuyvesant
 The Glorious Adventure (1918) - Bob Williamson
 Her Price (1918) - Robert Carroll
 Should Ladies Behave (1933) - Oscar McFarrey (uncredited)
 The Women in His Life (1933) - Judge Malone (uncredited)
 This Side of Heaven (1934) - Doctor (scenes deleted)
 Viva Villa! (1934) - Newspaperman (scenes deleted)
 Stand Up and Cheer! (1934) - Senator (uncredited)
 The Most Precious Thing in Life (1934) - Charles Kelsey (uncredited)
 Call It Luck (1934) - Mr. Morgan (uncredited)
 His Greatest Gamble (1934) - Detective Connors (uncredited)
 She Was a Lady (1934) - Minor Role (uncredited)
 Marie Galante (1934) - Assistant to Head of Bureau in Washington (uncredited)
 Wednesday's Child (1934) - Keyes
 Anne of Green Gables (1934) - Dr. Terry (uncredited)
 Times Square Lady (1935) - Barney Engel (uncredited)
 West Point of the Air (1935) - Officer at Randolph Air Field (uncredited)
 Strangers All (1935) - Prosecuting Attorney
 Let 'Em Have It (1935) - Department Chief
 Red Salute (1935) - Louis Martin
 Another Face (1935) - Bill Branch - Director
 Whipsaw (1935) - Chief Hughes
 The Prisoner of Shark Island (1936) - Agitating Orator (uncredited)
 It Had to Happen (1936) - Mayor of New York (uncredited)
 Every Saturday Night (1936) - Mr. Mewell
 Charlie Chan at the Circus (1936) - Joe Kinney
 Gentle Julia (1936) - Minister (uncredited)
 Champagne Charlie (1936) - Board Member (uncredited)
 Half Angel (1936) - District Attorney
 The Road to Glory (1936) - Army Captain
 Private Number (1936) - Rawlings
 Sins of Man (1936) - Minister
 Poor Little Rich Girl (1936) - George Hathaway
 The Crime of Dr. Forbes (1936) - Dr. John Creighton
 Sing, Baby, Sing (1936) - Brewster
 Star for a Night (1936) - Announcer (uncredited)
 The Longest Night (1936) - Mr. Grover, Head Buyer for the Store
 Dimples (1936) - Mr. St. Clair
 The Public Pays (1936, Short) - Moran (uncredited)
 Crack-Up (1936) - Daniel D. Harrington
 Career Woman (1936) - Arthur Henshaw
 Black Legion (1937) - Barham
 Dangerous Number (1937) - Police Sergeant (uncredited)
 Man of the People (1937) - District Attorney Joel Stringer
 Time Out for Romance (1937) - Harmon (uncredited)
 Midnight Taxi (1937) - Agent J. W. McNeary
 A Star Is Born (1937) - Academy Award Presenter (uncredited)
 It Could Happen to You (1937) - District Attorney
 Between Two Women (1937) - Mr. Sloan's Attorney (uncredited)
 It Can't Last Forever (1937) - U.S. Attorney (uncredited)
 Stella Dallas (1937) - Arthur W. Morley (uncredited)
 Souls at Sea (1937) - Defense Attorney (uncredited)
 Danger – Love at Work (1937) - Hilton
 Youth on Parole (1937) - Police Inspector
 The Awful Truth (1937) - Judge (uncredited)
 Portia on Trial (1937) - Judge
 Paid to Dance (1937) - Charles Kennedy
 City Girl (1938) - Ralph Chaney (uncredited)
 Condemned Women (1938) - Judge (uncredited)
 Law of the Underworld (1938) - Barton
 Kentucky Moonshine (1938) - Mortimer Hilton
 Rascals (1938) - Dr. Cecil Carter
 Army Girl (1938) - Maj. Thorndike
 My Lucky Star (1938) - Dean Reed
 The Story of Alexander Graham Bell (1939) - Chauncey Smith
 Rose of Washington Square (1939) - District Attorney
 Undercover Doctor (1939) - Courtney Weld
 Bachelor Mother (1939) - Hargraves
 Stronger Than Desire (1939) - Assistant D.A. Galway
 They Shall Have Music (1939) - Inspector Johnson (uncredited)
 Stanley and Livingstone (1939) - David Webb (scenes deleted)
 The Star Maker (1939) - Mr. Coyle
 Hollywood Cavalcade (1939) - Filson
 Mr. Smith Goes to Washington (1939) - Flood - Newsman (uncredited)
 20,000 Men a Year (1939) - Gerald Grant
 The Man Who Wouldn't Talk (1940) - Attorney Cluett
 And One Was Beautiful (1940) - Arthur Prince
 Queen of the Mob (1940) - Mr. Edmonds - Bank Manager
 I Love You Again (1940) - Mr. Littlejohn Sr.
 I Want a Divorce (1940) - Judge (uncredited)
 Public Deb No. 1 (1940) - Director (uncredited)
 Lady with Red Hair (1940) - Prosecuting Attorney Winter (uncredited)
 Road Show (1941) - Dr. Thorndyke (uncredited)
 Men of Boys Town (1941) - Dr. Trem Fellows (uncredited)
 Strange Alibi (1941) - Prosecutor
 The People vs. Dr. Kildare (1941) - Mr. Reynolds
 The Big Store (1941) - George Hastings
 Whistling in the Dark (1941) - Jennings
 The Night of January 16th (1941) - District Attorney
 The Body Disappears (1941) - Prosecutor (uncredited)
 You're in the Army Now (1941) - Lt. Col. Rogers
 Remember the Day (1941) - Committeeman (uncredited)
 Pacific Blackout (1941) - Judge
 The Adventures of Martin Eden (1942) - Attorney (uncredited)
 The Magnificent Dope (1942) - Peters
 Across the Pacific (1942) - Colonel Hart
 My Heart Belongs to Daddy (1942) - Mr. Whitman (uncredited)
 Lucky Jordan (1942) - George Hunnicutt - Draft Official (uncredited)
 Life Begins at Eight-Thirty (1942) - Store Official (uncredited)
 Flight for Freedom (1943) - Airport Official (uncredited)
 Slightly Dangerous (1943) - Stanhope
 Air Raid Wardens (1943) - Capt. Biddle
 Crash Dive (1943) - Officer (uncredited)
 So's Your Uncle (1943) - John L. Curtis
 Government Girl (1943) - Cedric L. Harvester (uncredited)
 Shine On, Harvest Moon (1944) - Ted Harvey (uncredited)
 Once Upon a Time (1944) - Dunhill (uncredited)
 Mr. Winkle Goes to War (1944) - A.B. Simkins (uncredited)
 Allergic to Love (1944) - Mr. Bradley
 She Gets Her Man (1945) - Dr. Bleaker
 Hit the Hay (1945) - J. Bellingham Parks
 The Stork Club (1945) - Mr. Hanson - Locke's Credit Manager (uncredited)
 Crime of the Century (1946) - Andrew Madison
 Holiday in Mexico (1946) - Sir Edward Owen (uncredited)
 Shadow of a Woman (1946) - Dr. Nelson Norris (uncredited)
 Sister Kenny (1946) - Dr. Gideon (uncredited)
 That's My Gal (1947) - Governor Thompson
 Welcome Stranger (1947) -  Mr. Daniels
 Cry Wolf (1947) - Davenport
 Her Husband's Affairs (1947) - Dr. Frazee
 Always Together (1947) - Dr. Peters (uncredited)
 My Wild Irish Rose (1947) - Augustus Piton
 Here Comes Trouble (1948) - Attorney Martin Stafford
 Look for the Silver Lining (1948) - Mr. Hoffman - Show Director (uncredited)
 The Fountainhead (1949) - Dean Who Expels Roark (uncredited)
 The Second Face (1950) - Dr. Crenshaw (uncredited)
 Santa Fe (1951) - Col. Cyrus K. Holliday (uncredited)
 Jet Job (1952) - Chairman (final film role)

References

External links

1884 births
1955 deaths
American male film actors
20th-century American male actors